The Ahtisaari Plan, formally the Comprehensive Proposal for the Kosovo Status Settlement (CSP), is a status settlement proposed by former President of Finland Martti Ahtisaari covering a wide range of issues related to the status of Kosovo.

Some of the main components of the plan include the formation of the International Steering Group for Kosovo (ISG), the International Civilian Representative for Kosovo (ICR), and the European Union Special Representative (EUSR) for Kosovo, appointed by the Council of the European Union.

In early 2012, then Serbian President Boris Tadić recommended his Five-Point Plan for Kosovo, essentially a reworking of the Ahtisaari Plan. 

On 10 September 2012, the International Steering Group had its final meeting and formally ended its supervision,
 and Kosovo became responsible for its own governance.

Overview
The proposal included provisions covering:

 Constitutional provisions
 Rights of Communities and their Members
 Decentralization of local government
 Justice system
 Religious and cultural heritage
 International debt
 Property and archives
 National security
 International Civilian Representative
 European Security and Defense Policy (ESDP) Rule of Law mission
 International Military Presence (such as the continuation of KFOR)
 Legislative agenda

While not yet mentioning the word "independence", it included several provisions that were widely interpreted as implying statehood for Kosovo. For example, it would give Kosovo the right to apply for membership in international organizations, create a security force and adopt national symbols.

History
Martti Ahtisaari stated in February 2007, after a period of consultations with the parties, that he would finalize his settlement proposal for submission to the UN Security Council, where he would also elaborate on the status issue itself.

In Belgrade, Serbian Prime Minister Vojislav Koštunica refused to meet Ahtisaari. Koštunica claimed that because Serbia had still not formed a new government after the January 21 parliamentary elections, he had no mandate to discuss Kosovo and therefore could not do so.  Nevertheless, he later denounced the proposal as "illegitimate and unacceptable" because it allegedly "violates the U.N. Charter ... by undermining sovereignty of U.N. member Serbia." President Boris Tadić did meet Ahtisaari, however, after which he reaffirmed his vow to never accept an independent Kosovo. Foreign Minister Vuk Drašković warned that it was "necessary to avoid an imposed solution that could cause Serbia to become a factor of instability."

In Pristina, Kosovo Albanian leaders issued a statement after meeting with Ahtisaari stating they are "convinced that the international process for the resolution of Kosovo's status led by President Ahtisaari will be concluded soon with Kosovo becoming an independent state."

The United States called the proposal "fair and balanced", while the EU Presidency noted that Ahtisaari's proposals "build on almost twelve months of direct talks between Belgrade and Pristina."

On 21 February 2007, Ahtisaari began a period of consultations with the parties in Vienna to finalize the settlement.  He made clear that his proposal was a draft and that he would incorporate compromise solutions into the final document.  After this period of consultations and further modification, Ahtisaari convened a high-level meeting of the parties in Vienna on March 10.  After this meeting, leaders from both sides signaled a total unwillingness to compromise on their central demands (Kosovo Albanians for Kosovo's independence; Serbia for continued sovereignty over Kosovo).  Concluding that there was no chance for the two sides to reconcile their positions, Ahtisaari said he intended to submit his proposed status recommendations to the UN Security Council, including an explicit recommendation for the status outcome itself by the end of March.

In November 2008, the EU accepted the demand of Serbia not to implement the plan of Ahtisaari through EULEX.

Reaction

On February 10, 2007, Kosovo Albanians protested against the Ahtisaari Plan. Two were killed and others seriously injured after Romanian Police serving in UNMIK fired rubber bullets at the demonstrators.

See also
Rambouillet Agreement

References

External links

Full text

Kosovo peace process
Plan
Kosovo–Serbia relations
Politics of Serbia
Politics of Kosovo